Leiothrix may refer to:

 Leiothrix (bird), a genus in the Old World babbler family
 Leiothrix (plant), a genus in the family Eriocaulaceae

See also